USS Alligator may refer to the following ships operated by the United States Navy:

 was a schooner built in 1809 as Gunboat No. 166 and named Alligator in 1812
 was a sloop purchased in 1813. The British captured her on 14 December 1814 during the Battle of Lake Borgne.
 was a schooner, launched in 1820, and scuttled in 1822
 was a non-commissioned submarine launched in 1862 and sank in April 1863.

United States Navy ship names